Mango float or crema de mangga is a Filipino icebox cake dessert made with layers of ladyfingers (broas) or graham crackers, whipped cream, condensed milk, and ripe carabao mangoes. It is chilled for a few hours before serving, though it can also be frozen to give it an ice cream-like consistency. It is a modern variant of the traditional Filipino crema de fruta cake. It is also known by various other names like mango refrigerator cake, mango graham float, mango royale, and mango icebox cake, among others. Crema de mangga is another version that additionally uses custard and gulaman (agar) or gelatin, as in the original crema de fruta.

Mango float can also be made with various other fruits like strawberries, pineapple, bananas, and cherries, among others. Combinations of different fruits result in a version closer to the original crema de fruta.

See also
Ube cheesecake
Ube cake
Sans rival
Silvana
Buko pie
Halo-halo
Trifle
Cassata
Tiramisu

References

Philippine desserts
Fruit dishes
No bake cakes